Alice Norin (born 21 June 1987) is a Norwegian-born Indonesian model, presenter and actress.

Biography 
Alice started her career in the modeling world when she was 13 years old. Apart from modeling, she is also exploring the world of roles by starring in several soap operas. The soap opera that has starred Alice, namely, Wulan. Not only the small screen, the eldest of 3 brothers also penetrates the big screen. Alice premiered horror genre film with the title Psychopath (2005). In this first film, Alice got the main role as Mita.

After exploring the world of models and soap operas, Alice tries to become a director. Alice is working on a video clip entitled Rusty Guitar which is on her husband  album Out Malam Repackage. For a long time, she had dreamed of becoming a director.

Personal life 
Alice married DJ Riri on January 19, 2007. Even though at that time she was not even 20 years old. The marriage ceremony for this celebrity couple was held at Alice's house in Bilangan Cipete on Friday, January 19, 2007, morning with a set of prayer tools as a dowry. Meanwhile, the reception with a blend of two cultures, Norwegian and Sundanese, was held at Pondok Indah Mosque. Recently (April 2009), Alice Norin admitted to having an affair with a man named Agus Laksmono Sudwikatmono.

Filmography 

 Information

 N/A : Not Available

FTV 

 TV Movie: Awas Kalau Lebaran Ini Gak Mudik (2013)
 TV Movie: Dimana Ibu Akan Tinggal (2014)
 TV Movie: Pembantu dan Majikan (2015)

Awards and nominations

References 

1987 births
People from Stavanger
Indo people
Minahasa people
Sundanese people
Norwegian emigrants to Indonesia
Indonesian people of Norwegian descent
Indonesian actresses
Indonesian models
Converts to Islam
Indonesian former Christians
Indonesian Muslims
Living people